Dueville is a town and comune in the province of Vicenza, Veneto, Italy. It is south of SP50.  As of 2007 Dueville had an estimated population of 13,988.

Twin towns – sister cities

Dueville is twinned with:
 Calatayud, Spain (1989)
 Schorndorf, Germany (1998)
 Tulle, France (2008)

Sources
(Google Maps)

Cities and towns in Veneto